The Negros forest frog (Platymantis negrosensis) is a species of frog in the family Ceratobatrachidae.
It is endemic to Panay and Negros, Philippines.

Its natural habitats are subtropical or tropical moist lowland forest and subtropical or tropical moist montane forest.
It is threatened by habitat loss.

References

Amphibians of the Philippines
Platymantis
Endemic fauna of the Philippines
Fauna of Negros Island
Taxonomy articles created by Polbot
Amphibians described in 1997